The canton of Ardres is a former canton situated in the department of the Pas-de-Calais and in the Nord-Pas-de-Calais region of northern France. It was disbanded following the French canton reorganisation which came into effect in March 2015. It had a total of 21,370 inhabitants (2012, without double counting).

Geography 
The canton was organised around Ardres in the arrondissement of Saint-Omer. The altitude varied from 0m (Éperlecques) to 196m (Rebergues) for an average altitude of 42m.

The canton comprised 22 communes:

Ardres
Audrehem
Autingues
Balinghem
Bayenghem-lès-Éperlecques
Bonningues-lès-Ardres
Brêmes
Clerques
Éperlecques
Journy
Landrethun-lès-Ardres
Louches
Mentque-Nortbécourt
Muncq-Nieurlet
Nielles-lès-Ardres
Nordausques
Nort-Leulinghem
Rebergues
Recques-sur-Hem
Rodelinghem
Tournehem-sur-la-Hem
Zouafques

Population

See also 
Cantons of Pas-de-Calais 
Communes of Pas-de-Calais 
Arrondissements of the Pas-de-Calais department

References

Ardres
2015 disestablishments in France
States and territories disestablished in 2015